Deodhani dance is a Shaman folk dance from the Indian state of Assam. It can be performed either solo or in a group. Deodhani is of Kachari origin. A group performance of Deodhani generally consists of three or four women. The dance form is associated with the worship of the snake goddess  Marei/Maroi. A Deodhani dance is generally performed to the accompaniment of songs sung by an Ojha, a Kachari traditional chorus leader in the Darrang district of Assam.

History

Deodhani is derived from two words – Deo, which means God, and Dhani, which means woman, literally meaning a woman possessed (Shaman) by god. A male Shaman form is also present, called 'Jaki' in South Kamrup and 'Deodhai' elsewhere in Assam. Deodhani depicts the dance of a Shaman woman or man when he or she is possessed by a spiritual being. In Deodhani, the songs sung by Ojapali are known as Xuknoni in undivided Darrang district whereas in undivided Kamrup district it is accompanied by Kamrupi Bor-Dhol's.

Specification
Dancers take a sword and shield and present a virile war dance during the performance.

References

Dances of Assam
Hindu dance traditions
Indian folk dances